The golden age of American animation was a period in the history of U.S. animation that began with the popularization of sound cartoons in 1928 and gradually ended in the late 1960s, where theatrical animated shorts began losing popularity to the newer medium of television animation, produced on cheaper budgets and in a more limited animation style by companies such as Hanna-Barbera, UPA, Jay Ward Productions, and DePatie-Freleng.

Many popular characters emerged from this period, including Disney's' Mickey Mouse, Minnie Mouse, Donald Duck, Daisy Duck, Goofy, and Pluto; Warner Bros.' Bugs Bunny, Daffy Duck, Porky Pig, Tweety, and Sylvester; MGM's Tom and Jerry and Droopy; Fleischer Studios' Betty Boop; Felix the Cat; Walter Lantz's Woody Woodpecker; Terrytoons' Mighty Mouse; UPA's Mr. Magoo; and Jay Ward Productions' Rocky and Bullwinkle.

Feature-length animation began during this period, most notably with Disney's "Walt-era" films, spanning from Snow White and the Seven Dwarfs in 1937 to The Jungle Book in 1967. Animation also began on television during this period, with the first animated series airing on television in 1948 starting with Crusader Rabbit.

Movie/animation studios

The Walt Disney Company

Beginnings
Walt Disney had decided to become a newspaper cartoonist drawing political caricatures and comic strips. However, nobody would hire Disney, so his older brother Roy, who was working as a banker at the time, got him a job at the Pesmen-Rubin Art Studio where he created advertisements for newspapers, magazines, and movie theaters. Here he met fellow cartoonist Ub Iwerks, the two quickly became friends and in January 1920, when their time at the studio expired they decided to open up their own advertising agency together called Iwerks-Disney Commercial Artists. The business however got off to a rough start and Walt temporarily left for the Kansas City Film and Ad Co. to raise money for the fleeting company and Iwerks soon followed as he was unable to run the business alone.

While working there he made commercials for local theaters using crude cut-out animation. Disney became fascinated by the art and decided to become an animator. He then borrowed a camera from work and rented a book from the local library called Animated Cartoons: How They Are Made, Their Origin and Development by Edwin G. Lutz and decided that cel animation would produce better quality and decided to open up his own animation studio. Disney then teamed up with Fred Harman and made their first film, The Little Artist which was nothing more than an artist (Disney) taking a cigarette break at his work desk. Harman soon dropped out of the venture, but Disney was able to strike a deal with local theater owner Frank L. Newman and animated a cartoon all by himself entitled Newman Laugh-O-Grams screened in roughly February 1921. Walt then quit his job at the film and ad company and incorporated Laugh-O-Gram Films in May 1922, and hired former advertising colleagues as unpaid "students" of animation including Ub Iwerks and Fred Harman's brother, Hugh Harman.

Throughout 1922, the Disney company produced a series of "modernized" adaptations of fairy tales including Little Red Riding Hood, The Four Musicians of Bremen, Jack and the Beanstalk, Jack the Giant Killer, Goldielocks and the Three Bears, Puss in Boots, Cinderella and Tommy Tucker's Tooth, the latter being mostly a live-action film about dental hygiene. None of these films turned a profit. The last film made by the Disney company was a short called Alice's Wonderland. Loosely inspired by Lewis Carroll's Alice's Adventures in Wonderland; the short featured a live-action five-year-old girl named Alice (Virginia Davis) who had adventures in a fully animated world. The film was never fully complete however as the studio went bankrupt in the summer of 1923.

Upon the closure of Laugh-O-Grams, Walt Disney worked as a freelance filmmaker before selling his camera for a one-way ticket to Los Angeles. Once arriving he moved in with his Uncle Robert and his brother Roy, who was recovering at a nearby government hospital from tuberculosis he had suffered during the war. After failing to get a job as a director of live-action films he sent the unfinished Alice's Wonderland reel to short-subjects distributor Margaret J. Winkler of Winkler Pictures in New York.  Winkler was distributing both the Felix the Cat and Out of the Inkwell cartoons at the time, but the Fleischer brothers were about to leave to set up their own distribution company, Red Seal Films, and Felix producer Pat Sullivan was constantly fighting with Winkler; therefore Winkler agreed to distribute Disney's Alice Comedies as sort of an insurance policy.

Once Walt Disney received the notice on October 15, he convinced Roy to leave the hospital and help him set up his business. The next day, on October 16, 1923, Disney Bros. Cartoon Studio opened its doors at a small rented office two blocks away from his uncle's house with Roy managing business and Walt handling creative affairs. He convinced Virginia Davis's parents which caused the first official Alice short, Alice's Day at Sea, to be released on January 1, 1924; delayed by eleven days. Ub Iwerks was re-hired in February 1925 and the quality of animation on the Alice series improved; this prompted Hugh Harman, Rudolf Ising and Carman Maxwell to follow Disney west in June 1925. Around that time, Davis was replaced with Maggie Gay and the cartoons started to focus less on the live-action scenes and more the fully animated scenes, particularly those featuring Alice's pet sidekick Julius, who bore an uncanny resemblance to Felix the Cat. In February 1926, Disney built a larger studio at 2719 Hyperion Avenue and changed the name of the company to Walt Disney Cartoons.

In November 1923, Winkler married Charles Mintz and handed over the business to him when she became pregnant a few months later. Mintz was often described as a cold, stern and ruthless chain-smoking tyrant; one employee remembered him as "a grim-faced man, with a pair of cold eyes glittering behind the pince nez" and "never talked to the staff. He looked us over like an admiral surveying a row of stanchions." While Winkler had offered gentle critiques and encouragement, Mintz communicated to Disney in a harsh and cruel tone. In 1927, Mintz ordered Disney to stop producing Alice Comedies due to the costs of combining live-action and animation.

Mintz managed to gain a distribution deal with Universal Studios; however it was Mintz—not Disney—that signed the deal. Disney and lead animator Ub Iwerks created Oswald the Lucky Rabbit, who debuted in Trolley Troubles short in 1927. The Oswald series was a success and became the first hit for the Walt Disney studio.

In the spring of 1928, Disney travelled to New York to ask Mintz for a budget increase. His request was harshly denied by Mintz, who pointed out that in the contract Mintz had signed with Universal, it was Universal—not Disney—that owned the rights to the character. Mintz revealed to Disney that he had hired most of his staff away from the studio (except for Ub Iwerks, Les Clark and Wilfred Jackson who refused to leave) and threatened that unless he took a 20 per cent budget decrease, he would drop Disney and continue the Oswald series by himself. Walt refused, and Winkler Pictures dropped its distribution.

Mickey Mouse
While Disney was finishing the remaining cartoons for Mintz, Disney and his staff secretly came up with a new cartoon character to replace Oswald — Mickey Mouse.

The inspiration for Mickey has never been clear. Walt Disney said that he came up with the idea on the train ride back to Los Angeles shortly after the confrontation with Mintz, but other records say that he came up with the idea after he returned to the studio. Walt Disney once said that he was inspired by a pet mouse he once had at the old Laugh-O-Grams studio, but more commonly said that he chose a mouse because a mouse had never been the central character of a cartoon series before.

In 1928, Plane Crazy became the first entry into the Mickey Mouse series; however, it was not released because of a poor reaction from test screenings and failed to gain a distributor. The second Mickey Mouse cartoon The Gallopin' Gaucho also failed to gain the attention of the audience and a distributor. Disney knew what was missing: sound. Sound film had been captivating audiences since 1927 with The Jazz Singer and Walt decided that the next cartoon Steamboat Willie would have sound. Steamboat Willie was not the first sound cartoon, Max and Dave Fleischer had produced Song Car-Tunes since 1926. However, they failed to keep the sound synchronized with the animation and the main focus of the cartoons were the bouncing ball sing-a-longs. The Song Car-Tunes were not a success and some staff members doubted whether a cartoon with sound would be successful. So Disney arranged a special preview screening with the music and sound effects being played live behind stage through a microphone. The Steamboat Willie test screening was a success and managed to gain a distributor, Celebrity Pictures chief Pat Powers. However, the first attempt to synchronize the sound with the animation was a disaster with the timing being all wrong. In order to finance the second recording, Walt sold his car. This time he used a click track to keep his musicians on the beat (Disney later learned that it was easier to record the dialogue, music and sound effects first and animate to the sound). Little more than a month before Steamboat Willies premiere, Paul Terry released his sound cartoon Dinner Time; however it was not a financial success and Walt Disney described it as "a bunch of racket".

The Golden Age of Disney

Beginnings (1920s–30s)
Steamboat Willie was released on November 18, 1928, and was a big success. Disney quickly gained huge dominance in the animation field using sound in his future cartoons by dubbing Plane Crazy, The Gallopin' Gaucho and the nearly completed The Barn Dance. Mickey Mouse's popularity put the animated character into the ranks of the most popular screen personalities in the world. Disney's biggest competitor, Pat Sullivan with his Felix the Cat, was eclipsed by Mickey's popularity and the studio closed in 1932.
Merchandising based on Disney cartoons rescued a number of companies from bankruptcy during the depths of the Depression, and Disney took advantage of this popularity to move forward with further innovations in animation.
In 1929, he launched a new series entitled the Silly Symphonies which was based around music with no recurring characters. However, they did not become as popular as the Mickey Mouse cartoon series.
In 1930, after a falling-out with Powers, Disney switched distributors to Columbia Pictures. However, Ub Iwerks left Walt Disney after an offer from Powers to be in charge of his own studio.
In 1932, Mickey Mouse had become an international sensation, but the Silly Symphonies had not. Columbia Pictures had backed out of its distribution of the series and Disney was lured to move the Silly Symphonies into United Artists by a budget increase.
Walt Disney then worked with the Technicolor company to create the first full three-strip color cartoon, Flowers and Trees. Another great success, it became the first cartoon to win the Academy Award for the Best Animated Short Film. Shortly afterward, Disney negotiated an exclusive, but temporary deal with Technicolor so only he could use the three-strip process in animated films—no other studio was permitted to use it. However, he withheld making Mickey Mouse in color because he thought that Technicolor might boost the Silly Symphonies''' popularity.
By 1932, Walt Disney had realized the success of animated films depended upon telling emotionally gripping stories that would grab the audience and not let go. This realization led to an important innovation around 1932–1933: a "story department", separate from the animators, with storyboard artists who would be dedicated to working on a "story development" phase of the production pipeline.
In turn, Disney's continued emphasis on story development and characterization resulted in another hit in 1933: Three Little Pigs, which is seen as the first cartoon in which multiple characters displayed unique, individual personalities and is still considered to be the most successful animated short of all time, and also featured the hit song that became the anthem in fighting the Great Depression: "Who's Afraid of the Big Bad Wolf".
In the Mickey Mouse series, he continued to add personality to his characters; this resulted in the creation of new characters such as Pluto with The Chain Gang in 1930, Goofy with Mickey's Revue in 1932 and Donald Duck in 1934 with The Wise Little Hen (under the Silly Symphony series). When Disney's contract with Technicolor expired, the Mickey Mouse series was moved into Technicolor starting with The Band Concert in 1935. In addition, Mickey was partially redesigned for Technicolor later that year.
In 1937, Disney invented the multiplane camera, which gave an illusion of depth to the animated world.  He first used this on the Academy Award-winning Silly Symphony cartoon The Old Mill. Much of Disney's work was heavily influenced by European stories and myths, and the work of illustrators such as Doré and Busch.
Also in 1937, Disney changed distributors for the Silly Symphonies to RKO Radio Pictures, remaining with this distributor until the early 1950s, when they were re-issued and re-released by Disney's new distribution company, Buena Vista Distribution.

Snow White and the Seven Dwarfs (1937)
In 1937, Walt Disney produced Snow White and the Seven Dwarfs, the first American feature-length animated musical fantasy film. This was the culmination of four years of effort by Disney studios. Walt Disney was convinced that short cartoons would not keep his studio profitable in the long run, so he took what was seen as an enormous gamble. The critics predicted that Snow White would result in financial ruin for the studio. They said that the colors would be too bright for the audience and they would get sick of the gags and leave. However, the critics were proven wrong. Snow White was a worldwide box office success, and was universally acclaimed as a landmark in the development of animation as a serious art form.

Pinocchio and Fantasia (1940)
After the success of Snow White, Disney went on to produce Pinocchio, which was released in 1940.  However, costing twice as much to make as Snow White, Pinocchio was not a financial success, since World War II (which began in Europe in 1939) had cut off 40% of Disney's foreign release market . Although it was a moderate success in the United States, the domestic gross alone was not enough to make back its production budget. However, the film did receive very positive reviews and has made millions from subsequent re-releases. 
Later that year, Disney produced Fantasia. It originally started with the Mickey Mouse cartoon The Sorcerer's Apprentice in an attempt to recapture Mickey's popularity, which had sharply declined due to the popularity of Max Fleischer's Popeye and Disney's Donald Duck. In the Sorcerer's Apprentice, Mickey Mouse was redesigned by Fred Moore. This redesign of Mickey is still in use today. The short featured no dialogue, only music which was conducted by Leopold Stokowski. When the budget for the short grew very expensive, Stokowski suggested to Disney that it could be a feature film with other pieces of classical music matched to animation. Disney agreed and production started. Fantasia would also become the first commercial film to be released in stereophonic sound. However, like Pinocchio, Fantasia was not a financial success. Fantasia was also the first Disney film not to be received well, receiving mixed reviews from the critics. It was looked down upon by music critics and audiences, who felt that Walt Disney was striving for something beyond his reach by trying to introduce mainstream animation to abstract art, classical music, and "elite" subjects. However, the film would be reevaluated in later years and considered an animated masterpiece.

Dumbo and Bambi (1941–42)
In 1941, in order to compensate for the relative poor box office of Pinocchio and Fantasia, Disney produced a low-budget feature film, Dumbo. Just a few days after rough animation was complete on Dumbo, the Disney animators' strike broke out. This was caused by the Screen Cartoonist's Guild (which had been formed in 1938), who severed many ties between Walt Disney and his staff, while encouraging many members of the Disney studio to leave and seek greener pastures. Later that year, Dumbo became a big success, the first for Disney since Snow White. The critically acclaimed film brought in much-needed revenue and kept the studio afloat. A few months after Dumbo was released in 1941, the United States entered the war after the attack on Pearl Harbor. This led to the mobilization of all movie studios (including their cartoon divisions) to produce propaganda material to bolster public confidence and encourage support for the war effort. 
The war (along with the strike) shook Walt Disney's empire, as the US Army had seized Disney's studio as soon as the US entered World War II in December 1941. As a result, Disney put the feature films Alice in Wonderland (1951), Peter Pan (1953), Qind in the Willows (1949), Song of the South (1946), Mickey and the Beanstalk (1947) and Bongo (1947) on hold until the war was over.
The only feature film that was allowed to continue production was Bambi, which was released in 1942. Bambi was groundbreaking in terms of animating animals realistically. However, due to the war, Bambi failed at the box-office and received mixed reviews from the critics. This failure was to be short-lived as it grossed a considerable amount of money in the 1947 re-release.

Wartime Era of Disney

Disney was now fully committed to the war effort and contributed by producing propaganda shorts and a feature film entitled Victory Through Air Power. Victory Through Air Power did poorly at the box office and the studio lost around $500,000 as a result. The required propaganda cartoon shorts were less popular than Disney's regular shorts, and by the time the Army ended its stay at Walt Disney Studios with the end of the war in 1945, Disney struggled to restart his studio, and had a low amount of cash on hand.
Further Disney feature films of the 1940s were modestly budgeted collections of animated short segments put together to make a feature film. These began with Saludos Amigos in 1942 and continued during the war with The Three Caballeros in 1944 and after the war with Make Mine Music in 1946, Fun and Fancy Free in 1947, Melody Time in 1948, and The Adventures of Ichabod and Mr. Toad in 1949. For the feature films Mickey and the Beanstalk, Bongo, and Wind in the Willows, he condensed them into the package films Fun and Fancy Free and The Adventures of Ichabod and Mr. Toad since Walt feared that the low-budget animation would not become profitable.
The most ambitious Disney film of this period was the 1946 film Song of the South, a musical film blending live-action and animation which drew criticism in later years for accusations of racial stereotyping.

The Silver Age of Disney (1950–67)

Early 1950s
In 1950, Disney produced Cinderella. Cinderella was an enormous success, becoming the highest-grossing film of 1950, and became Disney's most successful film since Snow White and the Seven Dwarfs and Disney's first single-narrative feature film to be entirely animated since Bambi, as films in the interim involved some live-action.
Disney's company started to diversify, producing live-action feature films beginning with Treasure Island (1950) and nature documentaries, the first of which being Seal Island (1948). As a result, Walt Disney was needed on several different units at one time and was spending less time on animation. In 1951, he released Alice in Wonderland, a project he had been working on since the late 1930s, though it was shelved during the war. Alice in Wonderland was initially moderately successful and received mixed reviews from the critics. A few decades later, the film would be hailed as one of Disney's greatest classics, making millions in subsequent theatrical and home video releases. In 1953, he released Peter Pan, which, like Alice in Wonderland, had been in production since the late 1930s/early 1940s and was shelved during the war. However unlike Alice, Peter Pan  was a big success both critically and financially on its first release.
When Disney's contract with RKO expired at the end of 1953, instead of renewing it as usual,  Disney was concerned about the instability of RKO (due to owner Howard Hughes' increasingly erratic control of the studio) and started distributing films through the newly created Buena Vista Distribution subsidiary. This allowed a higher budget for shorts and features than the last few years of cartoons made for RKO dictated, which made it possible to make some of the cartoons in the new CinemaScope format. However, the budget per short was nowhere near as high as it had been in the 1940s as Disney had been focusing more on live action, television, and feature animation and less on short animation. In 1953, shortly after the switch from RKO to Buena Vista, Disney released its final Mickey Mouse short, The Simple Things. From there, the studio produced fewer animated shorts by the year until the animated shorts division was eventually closed in 1956. After that, any future short cartoon work was done through the feature animation division until 1969. The last Disney animated short of the golden age of American animation, the Oscar-winning It's Tough to Be a Bird!, was released in 1969.

Late 1950s–60s
In 1955, Disney created Lady and the Tramp, the first animated film in CinemaScope.
Upon building Disneyland in 1955, Walt Disney regained a huge amount of popularity among the public, and turned his focus to producing his most ambitious movie: Sleeping Beauty. Sleeping Beauty was filmed in Super Technirama 70 mm film and in stereophonic sound like Fantasia. Sleeping Beauty also signaled a change in the style of drawing, with cartoony and angular characters; taking influence from United Productions of America (UPA). Although Sleeping Beauty was the second-highest-grossing film of 1959 (just behind Ben-Hur), the film went over budget, costing $6 million, and the film failed to make back its expenditure. The studio was in serious debt and had to cut the cost of animation. In 1960, this resulted in Disney switching to xerography, that replaced the traditional hand-inking.
The first feature film that used Xerox cels was 101 Dalmatians in 1961 which was a box-office success. However, the Xerox resulted in films with a "sketchier" look and lacked the quality of the hand-inked films. According to Floyd Norman, who was working at Disney at the time, it felt like the end of an era.
On December 15, 1966, Walt Disney died of lung cancer. The last two films he was involved in were The Jungle Book (1967) and The Many Adventures of Winnie the Pooh (1977), since one of the shorts Winnie the Pooh and the Honey Tree was released during his lifetime, and he was involved in the production of Winnie the Pooh and the Blustery Day. The animated musical comedy feature, The Jungle Book, and the live-action big-screen musical, The Happiest Millionaire, were released in 1967, a year after his death, and Winnie the Pooh and the Blustery Day was released two years later, while The Many Adventures of Winnie the Pooh was released in 1977. Winnie the Pooh and the Blustery Day also won the 1968 Academy Award for Animated Short Film. After Walt Disney's death, the animation department did not fully recover until the late 1980s and early 1990s with the Disney Renaissance.

Paramount Pictures

Fleischer Studios

Creation
One of Walt Disney's main competitors was Max Fleischer, the head of Fleischer Studios, which produced cartoons for Paramount Pictures. Fleischer Studios was a family-owned business, operated by Max Fleischer and his younger brother Dave Fleischer, who supervised the production of the cartoons. The Fleischers scored successful hits with the Betty Boop cartoons and the Popeye the Sailor series. Popeye's popularity during the 1930s rivaled Mickey Mouse at times, and Popeye fan clubs sprang up across the country in imitation of Mickey's fan clubs; in 1935, polls showed that Popeye was even more popular than Mickey Mouse. However, during the early 1930s, stricter censorship rules enforced by the new Production Code in 1934 required animation producers to remove risqué humor. The Fleischers, in particular, had to tone down the content of their Betty Boop cartoons, which waned in popularity afterwards. The Fleischers also had produced a number of Color Classics cartoons during the 1930s which attempted to emulate Walt Disney's use of color, but the series was not a success.

Feature-length films
In 1934, Max Fleischer became interested in producing an animated feature film shortly after Walt Disney's announcement of Snow White, however Paramount vetoed the idea. In 1936, Fleischer Studios produced the first of three two-reel Popeye Technicolor features: Popeye the Sailor Meets Sindbad the Sailor in 1936, Popeye the Sailor Meets Ali Baba's Forty Thieves in 1937, and Aladdin and His Wonderful Lamp in 1939.
In 1938, after Disney's success with Snow White and the Seven Dwarfs, Paramount had given the Fleischers permission to produce an animated feature film and Fleischer studio relocated itself from New York to Miami, Florida in order to avoid organized unions, which became a threat to the studio after a five-month strike occurred among Fleischer Studio workers in late 1937. Here the Fleischers produced Gulliver's Travels which was released in 1939. It was a small success and encouraged the Fleischers to produce more.

Superman and the fall of the studio
In May 1941, the Fleischers gave Paramount full ownership of the studio as collateral to pay off their debts left from the loans they obtained from the studio to make unsuccessful cartoons like Stone Age, Gabby, and Color Classics.  However, they still maintained their positions as heads of their studio's production. Under Paramount rule, the Fleischers brought Popeye into the Navy and contributed to the war effort, and would gain more success by beginning a series of spectacular Superman cartoons (the first of which was nominated for an Oscar) that have become legendary in themselves.
Despite the success Superman gave the studio, a major blow to the studio would occur when the married Dave started having an adulterous affair with the Miami secretary. This led to many disputes between the Fleischer Brothers until Max and Dave were no longer speaking to each other. In 1941, they released Mister Bug Goes to Town, unfortunately it was released a few days before the attack on Pearl Harbor, which caused  Mister Bug to fail at the box-office. Shortly after the film's poor box office, Dave Fleischer, still maintaining his position as co-chief of his studio, had left Fleischer Studios to run Columbia Pictures' Screen Gems cartoons. Due to this, Paramount Pictures had expelled Dave and Max Fleischer from their positions as the head of the cartoon studio.

Famous Studios

Conversion
Paramount took over the Fleischer studio completely and brought it under the fold of their own studio, renaming it Famous Studios and continuing the work that the Fleischers began. Isadore Sparber, Seymour Kneitel and Dan Gordon were promoted to directors (Disney veteran Bill Tytla directed shorts in the mid- to late 1940s after Gordon left the studio), while Sam Buchwald was promoted to executive producer. Paramount also discontinued the expensive Superman cartoons in 1943, in favor of adapting Little Lulu to theaters.
Famous Studios continued to release Popeye shorts, which shifted to color in 1943 as well as creating Noveltoons, an anthology short series similar to Fleischer's Color Classics. Noveltoons introduced many notable characters such as Blackie the Lamb, Wolfie (Blackie's main rival), Casper the Friendly Ghost (adapted from a children's story book), Little Audrey (a character similar to and replacing Little Lulu), Herman and Katnip (A cat and mouse duel similar to Tom and Jerry), Baby Huey (a large though dim-witted baby duck) and many other lesser known characters.
Famous also revived Screen Songs, another series inherited from Fleischer's. As early as 1945, Famous continued the series all the way up to 1951, when they lost the right of the name and the “bouncing ball” term. The series was renamed Kartunes and would continue for two extra years, where it would finally be discontinued.
In 1951, Sam Buchwald died from a heart attack, leaving Sparber and Kneitel as the lead producers and directors. Dave Tendlar was promoted to director in 1953.

Decline and closure
The departure of the Fleischers had an immediate effect on the studio: the Paramount cartoons of the war years continued to be entertaining and popular and still retained most of the Fleischer style and gloss, however animation fans and historians would note the studio's diverging tone after the end of the war, as the style was criticized for its highly formulaic story telling, lack of artistic ambition, violence, and its overall appeal towards children rather than both kids and adults. 
By the mid-1950s, Famous Studios was still releasing shorts but with tighter budgets. This was a standard industry practice at the time, since other animation studios were also releasing short films with tighter budgets due to the popularity of television. At the same time, the studio had really drastic changes. Paramount renamed the studio to Paramount Cartoon Studios, as well as discontinuing the Popeye shorts by 1957. Spooky Swabs (directed by Sparber, who died the next year) was the last Popeye short in theaters. Budgets for the shorts were so tight by the late 1950s, that the studio has to use limited animation techniques comparable to television animation at the time.
In the 1960s, Paramount continue to release thatrical cartoons, as well as teaming up with King Features Syndicate TV to co-produce Popeye the Sailor and other comic characters for television. After Seymour Kneitel died in 1964 from a heart attack, other animation veterans like Howard Post, James Culhane and Ralph Bakshi were hired to directed shorts late in the studio's lifespan. Cartoons produced during this period were Swifty and Shorty, Honey Halfwitch, Comic Kings, the Modern Madcaps series and Fractured Fables, all of which failed to revitalize the studio following the continuous budget restraints. 
In the winter of 1968, Paramount's new owners at the time, Gulf+Western, began the process to shutdown the cartoon studio. The shutdown was completed by December.

Warner Bros.

Harman-Ising era
In 1929, former Disney animators Hugh Harman and Rudolf Ising made a cartoon entitled Bosko, the Talk-Ink Kid, and tried to sell it to a distributor in 1930. Warner Bros. who had previously tried an unsuccessful attempt to set up a cartoon studio in New York in order to compete with Disney, agreed to distribute the series. Under producer Leon Schlesinger's guide Harman and Ising created Looney Tunes (the title being variation on Disney's award-winning Silly Symphonies) starring their character Bosko. A second Harman-Ising series, Merrie Melodies, followed in 1931. Both series showed the strong influence of the early Disney movies.

Harman & Ising break away
After disputes over the money, Harman-Ising parted company with Schlesinger (who rejected their demands for raised budgets) in 1933, taking Bosko with them to work with Metro Goldwyn Mayer. Schlesinger began his own cartoon operation under the new name Leon Schlesinger Productions, hiring Harman-Ising animator Friz Freleng and several others to run the studio. Animator Tom Palmer created a Bosko clone known as Buddy and answered to Walt Disney's use of color in the Silly Symphonies cartoons in 1934, and began making all future Merrie Melodies cartoons in color. However, since Walt Disney had an exclusive deal with Technicolor, Schlesinger was forced to use Cinecolor and Two Strip Technicolor until 1935 when Disney's contract with Technicolor had expired. In 1935, Schlesinger fired Tom Palmer and Buddy was retired.

The creation of new stars
In a 1935 Merrie Melodie directed by Friz Freleng entitled I Haven't Got a Hat  was the first screen appearance of Porky Pig. Also in 1935, Schlesinger hired a new animation director who proceeded to revitalize the studio: Tex Avery. Schlesinger put Avery in charge of the low-budget Looney Tunes in a low run-down old building the animators named Termite Terrace. Under Avery, Porky Pig would replace the Buddy series and become the first Warner Bros. cartoon character to achieve star power. Also at Termite Terrace animator Bob Clampett redesigned Porky from a fat, chubby pig to a more cute and childlike character.
Unlike the other cartoon producers at the time, Avery had no intention of competing with Walt Disney, but instead brought a new wacky, zany style of animation to the studio that would increase the Warner Bros. cartoons' popularity in the crowded marketplace. This was firmly established in 1937 when Tex Avery directed Porky's Duck Hunt. During production of the short, lead animator Bob Clampett elaborated the exit of the Duck character by having him jump up and down on his head, flip around and holler off into the sunset. This created the character of Daffy Duck. After Daffy was created, he would add even more success to Warner Bros. cartoons and replaced Porky Pig as the studio's most popular animated character, and Bob Clampett took over Termite Terrace, while Tex Avery took over the Merrie Melodies department.
The 1940 Academy Award-nominated cartoon A Wild Hare (directed by Avery) marked Bugs Bunnys official debut, as well as his first pairing with Elmer Fudd (Created by Chuck Jones that year). Bugs quickly replaced Daffy as the studio's top star. By 1942, Bugs had become the most popular cartoon character. Because of the success of Bugs, Daffy and Porky, the Schlesinger studio now had risen to new heights, and Bugs quickly became the star of the color  Merrie Melodies cartoons, which had previously been used for one-shot character appearances. By 1942, Warners' shorts had now surpassed Disney's in sales and popularity.
Frank Tashlin also worked with Avery in the Merrie Melodies department. He began at Warners in 1933 as an animator but was fired and joined Iwerks in 1934. Tashlin returned to Warners in 1936, taking over direction of Merrie Melodies department. He returned in 1943 directing Porky and Daffy cartoons. He left in late 1944 to direct live-action films.

Schlesinger sells the studio
Avery left Warner Bros. in 1941 and went to work at MGM. Avery created Droopy in 1943 and many other characters during his 12-year career at MGM.
Schlesinger sold his studio to Warner Bros. in August 1944. Edward Selzer was in turn named the new producer. By this time, Warner cartoons' top directors of the 1940s were Friz Freleng, Chuck Jones, Bob Clampett and recently Robert McKimson, who took over Frank Tashlin's unit after he left the studio. Their cartoons are now considered classics of the medium. They directed some of the most beloved animated shorts of all time, including (for Clampett) Porky in Wackyland, Wabbit Twouble, A Corny Concerto, The Great Piggy Bank Robbery, The Big Snooze, (for Freleng) You Ought to Be in Pictures, Rhapsody in Rivets, Little Red Riding Rabbit, Birds Anonymous, Knighty Knight Bugs, (for Jones) Rabbit Fire, Duck Amuck, Duck Dodgers in the 24½th Century, One Froggy Evening, What's Opera, Doc?, (for McKimson) Walky Talky Hawky, Hillbilly Hare, Devil May Hare, The Hole Idea and Stupor Duck.
Besides McKimson being promoted to director in the mid-1940s, Arthur Davis took over after Clampett in mid-1945, after being was fired by Selzer. Clampett went to work on Beany and Cecil.
Many well known recurring characters were created by Jones, Freleng, McKimson and Clampett, and most instantly became popular at this time. This included Tweety (1942), Pepé Le Pew (1945), Sylvester the Cat (1945), Yosemite Sam (1945), Foghorn Leghorn (1946), Marvin the Martian (1948), Wile E. Coyote and the Road Runner (1949), Granny (1950),  Speedy Gonzales (1953), The Tasmanian Devil (Taz) (1954),  and among others.
In 1948, Warners could no longer force theaters to buy their movies and shorts together as packages, due to the United States v. Paramount Pictures, Inc. anti-trust case that year. It resulted to shorts of the early 1960s to have tighter budgets. Davis' unit was shut down in 1949 by Warners due to budget issues, causing him to move to Freleng's unit to become one of his key animators. Edward Selzer in 1958, retired, leading to production manager John W. Burton to take his place. David DePatie assumed producer in 1960 after Burton left the studio.

DePatie-Freleng Enterprises and Warner Bros.-Seven Arts

After more than two decades at the top, Warner Bros. shut down the original "Termite Terrace" studio in 1963 and DePatie-Freleng Enterprises assumed production of the shorts, licensed by Warner Bros. Most of the series’ main cast of characters were retired from theaters at this time, including Warners most popular star, Bugs Bunny. Daffy Duck, however, would still appear in theatrical cartoons, mostly paired with Speedy Gonzales. Beside them, Porky Pig, Granny, Sylvester and the Goofy Gophers appeared in this era, but most appeared in just one or more shorts.
14 Wile E. Coyote and Roadrunner cartoons were also commissioned, with the last 11 being outsourced to Format Films, under direction of former Chuck Jones animator Rudy Larriva. These cartoons were not well received, and were criticized for its lack of spirit and charm to that of Jones’ shorts.
After DePatie-Freleng ceased production of Looney Tunes in 1967, Bill Hendricks was put in charge of production of the newly renamed Warner Bros.-Seven Arts animation studio, and hired veterans such as Alex Lovy and LaVerne Harding from the Walter Lantz studio, Volus Jones and Ed Solomon from Disney, Jaime Diaz who later worked on The Fairly OddParents as director, and David Hanan, who previously worked on Roger Ramjet. Hendricks brought only three of the original Looney Tunes veterans to the studio; Ted Bonniscken, Norman McCabe and Bob Givens. The studio's one-shot cartoons from this era were critically panned and are widely considered to be the worst in the studio's history: Cool Cat, Merlin the Magic Mouse, Chimp and Zee and Norman Normal, despite the later gaining a large cult following, were said to be witless, crudely animated as well as having poor writing and design because of the extremely low budgets the crew had to work with by this time. Alex Lovy left the studio in 1968 and Robert McKimson took over. McKimson mostly focused on the recurring characters Alex Lovy had created and two of his own creation, Bunny and Claude. The last of the original Looney Tunes shorts produced was Bugged by a Bee and the last Merrie Melodies short was Injun Trouble, which shares its name with another Looney Tunes short from 1938. The Warner Bros.-Seven Arts studio finally shut down in 1969. A total of 1,039 Looney Tunes shorts had been created.
A decade later, after the success of the film, The Bugs Bunny/Road Runner Movie, which consisted predominantly of footage from the classic shorts by Jones, a new in-house studio to produce original animation opened its doors in 1980 named Warner Bros. Animation, which exists to this day.

Metro-Goldwyn-Mayer

Ub Iwerks
At first, Mickey Mouse was drawn by Walt Disney's long-time partner and friend Ub Iwerks, who was also a technical innovator in cartoons, and drew an average of 600 drawings for Disney on a daily basis; Disney was responsible for the ideas in the cartoons, and Iwerks was responsible for bringing them to life. However, Iwerks left the Disney studio in 1930 to form his own company, which was financially backed by Celebrity Pictures owner Pat Powers. After his departure, Disney eventually found a number of different animators to replace Iwerks. Iwerks would produce three cartoon series during the 1930s: Flip the Frog and Willie Whopper for Metro-Goldwyn-Mayer, and the ComiColor Cartoons for Pat Powers' Celebrity Productions. However, none of these cartoons could come close to matching the success of Disney or Fleischer cartoons, and in 1933, MGM, Iwerks' cartoon distributor since 1930, ended distribution of his cartoons in favor of distributing Harman and Ising cartoons, and Iwerks left after his contract expired in 1934. After his stay with MGM, Iwerks' cartoons were distributed by Celebrity Pictures, and Iwerks would answer to Disney's use of Technicolor and create the Comicolor series, which aired cartoons in two-strip Cinecolor. However, by 1936, the Iwerks Studio began to experience financial setbacks and closed after Pat Powers withdrew financial aid to the studio. After animating at Warner Brothers creating Gabby Goat and going to Screen Gems which was making cartoons for Columbia Pictures at the time, Iwerks returned to Disney in 1940, where he worked as the head of the "special effects development" division until his death in 1971.

Harman and Ising
After MGM dropped Iwerks, they hired Harman and Ising away from Leon Schlesinger and Warner Bros and appointed them heads of the studio. They began producing Bosko and Happy Harmonies cartoons which were emulative of Disney's Silly Symphonies. However they failed to make a success in the theaters, and in 1937 the Bosko and Happy Harmonies series were discontinued and MGM replaced Harman and Ising with Fred Quimby. After Quimby took over, he kept a number of Harman and Ising's staff and scouted other animation studios for talent (including Warner director Friz Freleng for a short period of time). He created an animated adaptation of the comic book series The Katzenjammer Kids which he re-titled The Captain & The Kids. The Captain & The Kids series was unsuccessful. In 1939, however, Quimby gained success after rehiring Harman & Ising.
After returning to MGM, Ising created MGM's first successful animated star named Barney Bear. Harman directed his masterpiece Peace on Earth in the meantime. Despite this, both men would leave MGM in 1941 and 1943 respectively, as Harman would develop his own studio with for Disney animator Mel Shaw, while Ising quit to join the U.S. Army.

Barney Bear after Ising's departure
After Ising left MGM, his unit was left vacant until it was picked up again by animator George Gordon. He continued the  Barney Bear  series as well as directing other shorts such as The Storks Holiday, and a few other shorts featuring an unnamed donkey. Gordon was left uncredited for direction for most of the cartoons he directed. He later left the studio in 1943, leaving the unit vacant once again.
In late 1946, animators Michael Lah and Preston Blair teamed up to exclusively direct more  Barney Bear cartoons. Lah himself claimed to have finished Gordon's The Unwelcome Guest, which was unfinished and also featured Barney. Both were able to give the bear a new life, as the tone of these cartoons were more familiar to the comedic slapstick from other cartoons from Hanna-Barbera and Tex Avery. In just three more years, Lah and Blair's directorial careers were abruptly halted as MGM dissolved the third unit, only leaving Hanna-Barbera and Avery's units left.
By the 1950s, Tex Avery briefly departed MGM due to being overworked. Around the same time, Dick Lundy, who recently left Walter Lantz Production, was hired by MGM to fill the gap between Avery's departure. Barney Bear was once again commissioned for more cartoons, however, unlike the previous directors, Lundy changed Barney to speak full English, provided by Paul Frees. The manic style of direction from Avery's shorts is also noticeable in these shorts, as he was using Avery's unit. Upon late 1951, Avery returned to the studio, however, Lundy continued to direct Barney Bear shorts with his unit until 1954, where MGM finally canceled the Barney cartoons, as the studios would not direct any more cartoons featuring him.

Hanna-Barbera's Tom and Jerry
In 1939, William Hanna and Joseph Barbera started a partnership that would last for more than six decades until Hanna's death in 2001. The duo's first cartoon together was Puss Gets the Boot (1940), featuring an unnamed mouse's attempts to outwit a housecat named Jasper. Though released without fanfare, the short was financially and critically successful, earning an Academy Award nomination for Best Short Subject (Cartoons) of 1940. On the strength of the Oscar nomination and public demand, Hanna and Barbera set themselves to producing a long-running series of cat-and-mouse cartoons, soon christening the characters Tom & Jerry. Puss Gets the Boot did not win the 1940 Academy Award for Best Cartoon, but another MGM cartoon, Rudolf Ising's The Milky Way did, making MGM cartoon studio the first studio to wrestle the Cartoon Academy Award away from Walt Disney.
After appearing in Puss Gets the Boot, Tom and Jerry quickly became the stars of MGM cartoons. With Hanna-Barbera under their belts, MGM cartoon studio was finally able to compete with Walt Disney in the field of animated cartoons. The shorts were successful at the box office, many licensed products (comic books, toys, etc.) were released to the market, and the series would earn twelve more Academy Award for Short Subjects (Cartoons) nominations, with seven of the Tom and Jerry shorts going on to win the Academy Award: The Yankee Doodle Mouse (1943), Mouse Trouble (1944), Quiet Please! (1945), The Cat Concerto (1946), The Little Orphan (1948), The Two Mouseketeers (1951), and Johann Mouse (1952). Tom and Jerry was eventually tied with Disney's Silly Symphonies as the most-awarded theatrical cartoon series. No other character-based theatrical animated series has won more awards, nor has any other series featuring the same characters.
In addition to classical Tom and Jerry shorts, Hanna and Barbera also produced/directed for MGM cartoon studio half a dozen one-shot theatrical shorts besides it, including Gallopin' Gals (1940), Officer Pooch (1941), War Dogs (1943) and Good Will to Men (a remake of Peace on Earth, 1955). Fred Quimby retired in 1955, with Hanna and Barbera replacing him in charge of the remaining MGM cartoons (including the last seven Tex Avery's Droopy episodes) until 1958, when the studio shut down, ending all the animation productions, the duo started the Hanna-Barbera animated television series company afterwards.
Key to the successes of Tom and Jerry and other MGM cartoons was the work of Scott Bradley, who scored virtually all of the cartoons for the studio from 1934 to 1958. Bradley's scores made use of both classical and jazz sensibilities. In addition, he often used songs from the scores of MGM's feature films, the most frequent of them being "The Trolley Song" from Meet Me in St. Louis (1944) and "Sing Before Breakfast" from Broadway Melody of 1936.

Tex Avery's Cartoons
Meanwhile, Tex Avery came to MGM cartoon studio in 1941 and revitalized their cartoon studio with the same spark that had infused the Warner animators. Tex Avery's wild surreal masterpieces of his MGM studio days set new standards for "adult" entertainment in Code-era cartoons. Tex Avery did not like to use recurring characters but did stay faithful to a character throughout his career at MGM with Droopy, who was created in Dumb-Hounded in 1943. Tex also created Screwy Squirrel in 1944, but Tex was less fond of him and discontinued the series after five cartoons. He also created the inspired Of Mice and Men duo George and Junior in 1946, but only four cartoons were produced.

The studios latter years
In 1953, Metro-Goldwyn-Mayer closed down the Tex Avery unit. Avery also left the studio at the time, with MGM promoting Micheal Lah to take Avery's position to direct cartoons once again. Fred Quimby retired in 1955, with Hanna and Barbera replacing him in charge of the remaining MGM cartoons (including the last seven of Tex Avery's Droopy cartoons) until 1958, when the studio shut down the H-B unit, ending all the animation productions. The duo would eventually develop their own studio, Hanna-Barbera in 1957, inheriting most of the staff in the process.

Columbia Pictures

Charles Mintz and Screen Gems

After Charles Mintz was fired from Paramount & Universal he was still in charge of his own cartoon operation producing Krazy Kat cartoons for Columbia Pictures. After the failure of Toby the Pup, which RKO Pictures discontinued in favor of Van Beuren Studios, He created a new series featuring a boy named Scrappy, created by Dick Huemer in 1931. Scrappy was a big break for Mintz and was also his most successful creation, but his studio would suffer irreparable damage after Dick Huemer was fired from the Mintz Studio in 1933. In 1934, Mintz, like most other animation studios at the time, also attempted to answer Disney's use of Technicolor, and began making color cartoons through the Color Rhapsodies series; the series was originally in either Cinecolor or two-strip Technicolor, but moved to three-strip Technicolor after Disney's contract with Technicolor expired in 1935. However, the series failed to garner attention, and by 1939, Mintz was largely indebted to Columbia Pictures. As a result, Mintz sold his studio to Columbia. Columbia renamed the studio, which Mintz still managed, Screen Gems; Mintz died the following year.
Frank Tashlin and John Hubley, were Disney animators who left during the strike, and obtained jobs at Screen Gems, where Tashlin served as head producer while Hubley acted as director for studio. Tashlin helped Screen Gems gain more success by introducing The Fox and the Crow, Screen Gems' biggest stars. Tashlin maintained his position until Columbia Pictures released him from the studio in favor of Dave Fleischer in 1942. The Screen Gems cartoons were only moderately successful and never gained the artistic talent of Disney, Warner Bros. or MGM. Columbia Pictures closed the studio in 1949 and started looking for a new cartoon production company.

United Productions of America

In 1941, John Hubley left Screen Gems and formed a studio with former Disney animators Stephen Bosustow, David Hilberman, and Zachary Schwartz, who—like Hubley—had left Walt's nest during the animator's strike. The studio Hubley founded was a newer, smaller animation studio that focused on pursuing Hubley's own vision of trying out newer, more abstract and experimental styles of animation. Bosustow, Hilberman, and Schwartz named the new studio as Industrial Film and Poster Service, or IFPS. Artistically, the studio used a style of animation that has come to be known as limited animation. The first short from the newly formed studio was Hell-Bent for Election (directed by Warners veteran Chuck Jones), a cartoon made for the re-election campaign of Franklin D. Roosevelt. Although this new film was a success, it did not break the boundaries that Hubley and his staffers had hoped. It wasn't until the third short, Bobe Cannon's Brotherhood of Man, that the studio began producing shorts aggressively stylized in contrast to the films of the other studios. Cannon's film even preached a message that, at the time, was looked down upon—racial tolerance. By 1946, the studio was renamed as United Productions of America (UPA), and Hilberman and Schwartz had sold their shares of the studio stock to Bosustow.
In 1948, UPA also found a home for itself at Columbia Pictures and began producing theatrical cartoons for the general public, instead of just using propaganda and military training themes; UPA also earned itself two Academy Award nominations for new cartoons starring The Fox and the Crow during its first two years in production. From there, the UPA animators began producing a series of cartoons that immediately stood out among the crowded field of mirror-image, copycat cartoons of the other studios. The success of UPA's Mr. Magoo series made all of the other studios sit up and take notice, and when the UPA short Gerald McBoing-Boing won an Oscar, the effect on Hollywood was immediate and electrifying. The UPA style was markedly different from everything else being seen on movie screens, and audiences responded to the change that UPA offered from the repetition of usual cat-mouse battles. Mr Magoo would go on to be the studio's most successful cartoon character. However, UPA would suffer a major blow after John Hubley was fired from the studio during the McCarthy Era in 1952, due to suspicions of his having ties to Communism; Steve Bosustow took over, but was not as successful as Hubley, and the studio was eventually sold to Henry Saperstein.
By 1953, UPA had gained great influence within the industry. The Hollywood cartoon studios gradually moved away from the lush, realistic detail of the 1940s to a more simplistic, less realistic style of animation. By this time, even Disney was attempting to mimic UPA.  1953's  shorts Melody and Toot, Whistle, Plunk and Boom in particular were experiments in stylization that followed in the footsteps of the newly formed studio.
Around 1952, Eric Porter proposed two cartoons to Columbia, but these were rejected and both cartoons are currently in the public domain.

Feature-length films and Decline
In 1959, UPA released 1001 Arabian Nights starring Mr Magoo, however, this was proved to be a failure, as this cost UPA their distribution deal with Columbia Pictures. they tried once more in 1962, UPA released Gay Purr-ee with the voice talents of Judy Garland, this time, with a distributor in Warner Brothers. In 1964, UPA decided to abandon animation and simply become a distribution company, where they would go on to distribute some of the Godzilla movies to America.

Hanna-Barbera

Prior to UPA's termination, Columbia struck a 10-year distribution deal with Hanna-Barbera, which had just left the freshly shut down Metro-Goldwyn-Mayer Cartoon Studio. This deal would mostly be involved with Columbia's TV division, Screen Gems, which ironically borrowed the name from the animation studio. In 1959, Hanna-Barbera produced the only theatrical series for Columbia, Loopy De Loop. This series was a success, and ran until 1965. Hanna-Barbera also produced 2 movies for Columbia, which was Hey There, It's Yogi Bear! and The Man Called Flintstone. Columbia's 10-year contract with Hanna-Barbera expired in 1967, and was not renewed, thus ending Columbia's association with Hanna-Barbera in every way.

Universal Pictures/Walter Lantz Productions

Beginnings
In 1928, Walter Lantz replaced Charles Mintz as producer of Universal Studios cartoons. Walter Lantz's main character at this time was Oswald the Lucky Rabbit, whose earlier cartoons had been produced by both Walt Disney and Charles Mintz. Lantz also started to experiment with color cartoons, and the first one, called Jolly Little Elves, was released in 1934. In 1935, Walter Lantz made his studio independent from Universal Studios, and the studio was now only the distributors of his cartoons, instead of the direct owners.
After seeing Disney's success of their first film Snow White and the Seven Dwarfs, Lantz planned to produce a full-length animation film based on the story Aladdin, and should’ve starred the famous comedy duo Abbot and Costello. However, due to the financial bomb of Mr. Bug Goes to Town, Lantz pulled the idea and the film was never produced.

New Stars and United Artists
In the 1940s, Oswald began to lose popularity. Lantz and his staff worked on several ideas for possible new cartoon characters (among them Meany, Miny, and Moe and Baby-Face Mouse). Eventually one of these characters clicked; his name was Andy Panda, who aired in Technicolor. However successful Andy was, it was not until the character's fifth cartoon, Knock Knock that a real breakthrough character was introduced. This was none other than Woody Woodpecker, who become Lantz's most successful creation. For most of the studios life at the time, Lantz and Alex Lovy directed most of the cartoons until 1942, when Shamus Culhane (a former Disney animator who recently had a brief stint at Fleischer Studios and Warner Bros.) took Lantz' and Lovy's role of director. As a result, the cartoons had a more denser and surreal direction, similarly more in line to the MGM Cartoons. Due to negotiation issues between Lantz and Universal Studios (renamed as Universal-International), Lantz withdrawals from his parent company and contracted to distribute shorts under United Artists between 1947 and 1949. The shorts in this period were noticeable for having better animation from the shorts released under Universal. This was due to being influenced by director and Disney Veteran Dick Lundy, as well as the arrival of more professional animations, such as Ed Love, Fred Moore and Ken O'Brien. This was also the era where Andy Panda was officially discontinued due to his waning popularity. In total, 12 shorts were released under United Artists.

The 1950s, and Later Years
Due to a plethora of issues between distributors and exceeding loans from Bank of America, Lantz was forced to close down his studio in 1949 in order to reduce said loans. It opened again in 1950 with a downsized staff, mainly because Lantz was able to sign a deal with Universal (known as Universal-International in this period) for more Woody Woodpecker cartoons, starting with 1951's Puny Express. Woody would continue to appear in cartoons until the early 1970s.
Paul J. Smith, a Disney veteran who worked for Lantz in the 40s, returned to work for the studio for the majority of the studio's lifespan at this time as an animator, and later a director. Paul created Chilly Willy, who first appeared in 1953, and became Lantz' second most popular character besides Woody. He would later be refined by Tex Avery in the following year, who left MGM earlier that decade. Avery himself would direct only 4 shorts during his time at Walter Lantz Productions, until finally leaving his career of directing animated shorts in 1956. Additional directional contributions included Don Patterson, Jack Hannah, and Sid Marcus. Alex Lovy also returned as role of director since the early 40s. Walter Lantz finally shut down the studio in 1973, saying that continuing to produce shorts would be impossible due to rising inflation, which seemed to have tightened his cartoons budgets by the late 1950s. However, for Walter Lantz, Woody Woodpecker's survival was lengthened when he started appearing in The Woody Woodpecker Show from 1957 to 1987, from which it entered syndication until 1990. NBC revived the show twice—in 1991 and 1992, and finally in 1997, Lantz sold all of the Woody Woodpecker shorts to Universal, then part of MCA.

Terrytoons

Before Terrytoons
Before Paul Terry created his own studio, he was employed by Bray Productions, where he created his first popular character, Farmer Al Falfa. Later in 1921, he co-funded the Fables Animation studios with Amedee J. Van Beuren. Beuren however became anxious in the late 1920s due to the phenomenon of a new film format of pre-synchronized sound in film. Beuren urged Terry to produce films in this format, but refused, forcing him to fire Terry in 1929.

Terrytoons is formed
After losing his Aesop's Film Fables series to Van Beuren Studios in 1929, Terry established a new studio called Terrytoons. Most of the staff of Fables Animation moved with him to the new studio, including Art Babbitt, who later became one of Disney's most known animators.
Terrytoons produced 26 cartoons a year for E.W. Hammons' Educational Pictures, which in turn supplied short-subject product to the Fox Film Corporation. Terry's cartoons of the 1930s were mainly black-and-white musical cartoons without recurring characters, except for Farmer Al Falfa, who had appeared in Paul Terry's cartoons since the silent era.  Educational foundered in the late 1930s, and Terry signed directly with Fox to distribute his pictures.
The 1930s and 1940s brought Terry's most popular and successful characters, Gandy Goose beginning in 1938, Mighty Mouse beginning in 1942, and Heckle and Jeckle, developed by combining what was originally a husband-and-wife pair of mischievous magpies from the 1946 Farmer Al Falfa cartoon The Talking Magpies with Terry's notion that twin brothers or look-alikes had comic possibilities. Other characters include Dinky Duck in 1939, Dimwit the Dog (originally paired with Heckle and Jeckle), Sourpuss (usually paired with Gandy Goose) and among others. Terrytoons was also nominated four times for the Academy Award for Animated Short Film: All Out for V in 1942, My Boy, Johnny in 1944, Mighty Mouse in Gypsy Life in 1945, and Sidney's Family Tree in 1958.
Despite the success, Terry's cartoons are known to have the lowest-budgets out of any major studio at the time. Popular music for example was not used for the majority of the studio's life, as Terry refused to pay royalties, making music director Philip A. Scheib to compose original scores. Credits were also sparse. Until 1957, the cartoons only credited the director, the story writer and the music director. The cartoons were also experimental and lacked quality control, leading to animators animating in a very inconstant style (animator James "Jim" Tyer is well known for animating in a very loose and off-model style).

Terry sells the studio to CBS
Terry sold his company and its backlog to CBS in 1953 and retired.  CBS continued to operate the studio for nearly 15 years afterward, with the studios now under management by Gene Deitch. The output divided between theatrical short cartoons and television series, as well as creating new characters such as Tom Terrific, Lariat Sam, and Deputy Dawg, Sidney the Elephant, Gaston Le Crayon, John Doormat, and Clint Clobber (who would be used again as Tom's human owner in Deitch's Tom and Jerry). Around this time, Terrytoons also began producing cartoons in CinemaScope.
New staff members were also joined the crew, including former Famous Studios animators David Tendlar and Martin Taras,  and Ralph Bakshi, who is considered Terrytoons most talented member of the studio. Terrytoons finally closed its doors in 1972, in which Bakshi moved to Famous Studios as a director, though it also closed that year.

Van Beuren Studios

In 1928, producer Amadee J. Van Beuren formed a partnership with Paul Terry and formed the "Aesop's Fables Studio" for the production of the Aesop's Film Fables cartoon series. In 1929, Terry left to start his own studio and was replaced by John Foster who took over the animation department, and renamed the studio Van Beuren Studios.
Van Beuren continued the Aesop's Fables series, and unsuccessfully tried a cartoon adaptation of radio blackface comedians Amos 'n Andy.  Other Van Beuren cartoons featured Tom and Jerry (not the cat and mouse, but a Mutt and Jeff-like human duo,) and Otto Soglow's comic strip character The Little King. Frank Tashlin and Joseph Barbera were among animators who worked briefly for the studio during its short life.
In 1934, as other studios were putting cartoons in Technicolor to answer to Disney's Silly Symphonies cartoon series, Van Beuren Studio abandoned its remaining cartoons and answered Disney's use of Technicolor by creating the Rainbow Parade series, which was all color. However, the series was not a success, and by 1936, RKO Pictures, the owner of the Van Beuren Studio, closed the studio as RKO chose to instead distribute Disney cartoons.

Republic Pictures

In 1946, Republic Pictures incorporated a piece of animation by Walter Lantz into Sioux City), a western starring Gene Autry. That same year, Bob Clampett, who had just left Warner Bros., got to direct one cartoon with the title It's a Grand Old Nag before the company cancelled a potential animated series. In 1949, Republic started a new cartoon series called Jerky Journeys, led by Art Heineman. The cartoons were not fully animated (only used for quick-paced sequences), but featured layouts and background designs by Robert Gribbroek, Peter Alvarado and Paul Julian, all of which were from Warner Bros. Republic discontinued the series after four cartoons were made.

Jay Ward Productions

Founded in 1948 by animator Jay Ward, Jay Ward Productions aired the first cartoon made for television, Crusader Rabbit and is also remembered for The Adventures of Rocky and Bullwinkle and Friends (1959–1964), as well as several iconic advertisements, such as those for breakfast cereals. Employing a limited animation style, the success of Jay Ward cartoons laid in its densely-packed visual gags and wordplay.

Trends
Sound in animation
While much of the focus in an animated cartoon is on the visuals, the vocal talents and symphonic scores that accompanied the images were also very important to the cartoons' success. As motion pictures drew audiences away from their radio sets, it also drew talented actors and vocal impressionists into film and animation. Mel Blanc gave voice to most of Warner Bros. more popular characters, including Bugs Bunny, Porky Pig (starting in 1937), and Daffy Duck. Other voices and personalities from vaudeville and radio contributed to the popularity of animated films in the Golden Era.  Some of these (generally uncredited) actors included Cliff Edwards (also known as Ukulele Ike), Arthur Q. Bryan, Stan Freberg, Bea Benaderet, Bill Thompson, Grace Stafford, Jim Backus, June Foray, and Daws Butler.

Cartoons of this era also included scores played by studio orchestras. Carl Stalling at Schlesinger/Warner Bros., Scott Bradley at MGM and Winston Sharples at Paramount composed numerous cartoon soundtracks, creating original material as well as incorporating familiar classical and popular melodies. Many of the early cartoons, particularly those of Disney's Silly Symphonies series, were built around classical pieces. These cartoons sometimes featured star characters, but many had simple nature themes.

Stop motion and special effects
For a great part of the history of Hollywood animation, the production of animated films was an exclusive industry that did not branch off very often into other areas. The various animation studios worked almost exclusively on producing animated cartoons and animated titles for movies.  Only occasionally was animation used for other aspects of the movie industry. The low-budget Superman serials of the 1940s used animated sequences of Superman flying and performing super-powered feats which were used in the place of live-action special effects, but this was not a common practice.

The exclusivity of animation also resulted in the birth of a sister industry that was used almost exclusively for motion picture special effects: stop motion animation. In spite of their similarities, the two genres of stop-motion and hand-drawn animation rarely came together during the Golden Age of Hollywood. Stop-motion animation made a name for itself with the 1933 box-office hit King Kong, where animator Willis O'Brien defined many of the major stop motion techniques used for the next 50 years. The success of King Kong led to a number of other early special effects films, including Mighty Joe Young, which was also animated by O'Brien and helped to start the careers of several animators, including Ray Harryhausen, who came into his own in the 1950s. George Pal was the only stop-motion animator to produce a series of stop-motion animated cartoons for theatrical release, the Puppetoon series for Paramount, some of which were animated by Ray Harryhausen. Pal went on to produce several live-action special effects-laden feature films.

Stop motion animation reached the height of its popularity during the 1950s. The exploding popularity of science fiction films led to an exponential development in the field of special effects, and George Pal became the producer of several popular special effects-laden films.  Meanwhile, Ray Harryhausen's work on such films as Earth vs. the Flying Saucers, The Seventh Voyage of Sinbad, and The Beast from 20,000 Fathoms drew in large crowds and encouraged the development of "realistic" special effects in films. These effects used many of the same techniques as cel animation, but still the two media did not often come together. Stop motion developed to the point where Douglas Trumbull's effects in 2001: A Space Odyssey seemed lifelike to an unearthly degree.

Hollywood special effects continued to develop in a manner that largely avoided cel animation, though several memorable animated sequences were included in live-action feature films of the era. The most famous of these was a scene during the movie Anchors Aweigh, in which actor Gene Kelly danced with an animated Jerry Mouse (of Tom and Jerry fame). But except for occasional sequences of this sort, the only real integration of cel animation into live-action films came in the development of animated credit and title sequences. Saul Bass' opening sequences for Alfred Hitchcock's films (including Vertigo, North by Northwest, and Psycho) are highly praised, and inspired several imitators.

The wartime era

The major Hollywood studios contributed greatly to the war effort, and their cartoon studios pitched in as well with various contributions. At the Fleischer studios, Popeye the Sailor joined the Navy and began fighting Nazis and "Japs"; while the Warner Bros. studio produced a series of Private Snafu instructional film cartoons especially for viewing by enlisted soldiers. Even Disney was involved in the war effort, producing both satirical comedies such as Der Fuhrer's Face, and commentaries such as Education for Death.

Decline of theatrical shorts

DePatie–Freleng Enterprises

The 1960s saw some creative sparks in the theatrical film medium, in particular from DePatie–Freleng Enterprises. Their first and most successful project was animating the opening titles for the 1964 film, The Pink Panther, starring Peter Sellers. The film and its animated sequences were so successful that United Artists commissioned the studio to produce a Pink Panther cartoon series. The first short, The Pink Phink, won the Academy Award for Best Animated Short Film of 1964. The studio also produced other successful cartoon series such as The Inspector and The Ant and the Aardvark.

Meanwhile, Chuck Jones, who had been fired from Warner Bros., moved to MGM to produce thirty-four theatrical Tom and Jerry cartoons in late 1963. These cartoons were animated in his distinctive style, but they never quite matched the popularity of the Hanna-Barbera originals of the 1940s and 1950s heyday. However, they were more successful than the Gene Deitch Tom and Jerry shorts, which were produced overseas during 1961 and 1962.

From 1964 to 1967, DePatie–Freleng produced Looney Tunes and Merrie Melodies shorts under contract with Warner Bros. These cartoons can be recognized easily because they use the modern abstract WB logos instead of the famous bullseye WB shield concentric circles. The studio also subcontracted 11 Wile E. Coyote and the Road Runner cartoons to Format Films. DePatie–Freleng ceased production of Looney Tunes and moved to the San Fernando Valley in 1967 to continue production of their Pink Panther cartoons producing the final original theatrical cartoon in 1977. The subsequent Pink Panther shorts 1978–1981 were originally produced for television and then released into theaters. In 1967, WB would resume production on their own cartoons, before shutting down the theatrical cartoon department altogether in 1969. In 1981, the studio was purchased by Marvel Comics and was renamed Marvel Productions.

Hanna–Barbera

In 1946, the animation union of the time negotiated a pay increase of 25%, making the cartoons more expensive to produce on a general basis. After the 1948 verdict following the Hollywood Antitrust case, there was no longer a booking guarantee on the theatres for cartoons from any of the studios, making it a more risky business and because of this less resources were invested in the theatrical shorts, causing a gradual decline. By the beginning of the 1950s, the medium of television was beginning to gain more momentum, and the animation industry began to change as a result. At the head of this change were the tandem of William Hanna and Joseph Barbera, the creators of Tom and Jerry. The new Hanna-Barbera utilized the limited animation style that UPA had pioneered. With this limited animation, Hanna and Barbera created several characters including Huckleberry Hound, The Flintstones, Yogi Bear and Top Cat. With television's growing popularity, which included the Saturday morning cartoons, a much more significant decline began in movie-going in the 1960s. To face the competition from TV, the theaters did what they could to reduce their own costs. One way of doing so was booking features only and avoiding the expenses of shorts, which were considered unnecessary and too expensive. Those few shorts that found their way to the theaters despite this are often viewed by critics as inferior to their predecessors.

Timeline
This is a timeline of American animation studios' active production of regularly released cartoon shorts for theatrical exhibition. Some studios continue to release animated shorts to theaters on an infrequent basis. The colors correspond to the animation studio's associated theatrical distributor.

Legacy
Seven animated features from Disney (Snow White, Pinocchio, Fantasia, Dumbo, Bambi, Cinderella and Sleeping Beauty) and 
several animated shorts (Steamboat Willie, Betty Boop's take of Snow White, Three Little Pigs, Popeye Meets Sinbad the Sailor, Porky in Wackyland, Gerald McBoing Boing, The Tell-Tale Heart, Duck Amuck and What's Opera Doc?) were each inducted into the National Film Registry. They were also part of animation historian's Jerry Beck's 1994 book survey of The 50 Greatest Cartoons.

Depictions in popular culture
The 1988 film  Who Framed Roger Rabbit has honored both the golden age of American animation and classical Hollywood cinema. The film featured cameos of various characters from multiple studios, such as Disney, Warner Bros., Fleischer Studios, and Universal, among others. The film also contains the only time in cinematic history that Disney's Mickey Mouse and Donald Duck cross over with Warner Bros. Studios' Bugs Bunny and Daffy Duck, respectively, onscreen.

The 2017 video game Cuphead features an animation style inspired by the works of Disney and Fleischer from this period.

See also

 History of animation
 Animated cartoon
 List of animation shorts

References

Sources
 Barrier, Michael (1999): Hollywood Cartoons. Oxford University Press.
 Maltin, Leonard (1987): Of Mice and Magic: A History of American Animated Cartoons. Penguin Books.
 Solomon, Charles (1994): The History of Animation: Enchanted Drawings''. Outlet Books Company.

20th century in animation
American animation
Articles which contain graphical timelines
American animation
Nostalgia in the United States
History of animation
1920s in animation
1930s in animation
1940s in animation
1950s in animation
1960s in animation